Dalboșeț is a commune in Caraș-Severin County, western Romania with a population of 1,919 people. It is composed of seven villages: Bârz, Boina, Boinița, Dalboșeț, Prislop, Reșița Mică (Kisresica) and Șopotu Vechi (Ósopot).

Șopotu Vechi has many old water mills built on the Șopotu river, a tributary of the Nera river. It was there that Iosif Traian Bădescu, a future bishop of Caransebeș, was born in 1858.

References

Communes in Caraș-Severin County
Localities in Romanian Banat
Place names of Slavic origin in Romania